"Level Up" is a song by American singer-songwriter Ciara released on July 17, 2018 by Beauty Marks Entertainment and Warner Bros. Records.

Influenced by the Jersey club variety of electronic dance music, the song was written by Ciara, J.R. Rotem, Theron Thomas, Telly Brown, Jr. and Theron Feemster, with production by J.R. Rotem and Nas Luke. It samples the Jersey Remix of "We Are Young" by Fun. that was also used in DJ Telly Tellz's 2017 viral hit "Fuck It Up Challenge". Its music video was directed and choreographed by New Zealand dancer Parris Goebel, who also appears in the video alongside fellow New Zealanders ReQuest Dance Crew.

Reception to the music video was positive, with "Level Up" becoming the number one trending video on YouTube and spawning the #LevelUpChallenge on social media, featuring fans and celebrities recording their own version of the video's choreography. The official remix for "Level Up" was released a week later featuring additional vocals from Missy Elliott and Fatman Scoop. Chartwise, "Level Up" peaked within the upper half of the US Hot R&B/Hip-Hop Songs chart in the United States, top forty in Hungary and top sixty on the US Billboard Hot 100.

Composition
"Level Up" is a song about empowerment and growth. The song's title directly references Ciara's controversial #LevelUp marriage tweet, which some felt blamed women for being single. She later cleared up the message, explaining that she wanted to empower women as she felt her "lowest moment" as a solo parent before learning to love herself. Some critics also believed parts of the song were aimed at ex-fiance, American rapper Future.

Promotion
In promotion of the single, fans initiated the "Level Up Challenge", which generated hundreds of thousands of responses on social media. The challenge consisted of fans mimicking the choreography performed in the accompanying music video. Ciara added onto the challenge by encouraging fans to share three ways in which they want to "level up" or better themselves. Fans and celebrities alike participated in the challenge, including Chris Pratt, Kelly Clarkson, Serena Williams, Macklemore, Janelle Monae, Missy Elliott, Jennifer Hudson, and Ciara's husband, Russell Wilson. Ciara also performed the song as a part of her set list as an opening act for singer, Bruno Mars' 24K Magic World Tour (2018).

Remix
On July 26, 2018, Ciara premiered the song's official remix, featuring Missy Elliott and Fatman Scoop. The three of them previously worked together on Elliott's single "Lose Control".

Chart performance
In the United States, "Level Up" debuted at 77 on the US Billboard Hot 100 on July 31, 2018, for the chart week dated August 4, 2018; it ascended to number 59 the following week. It debuted at number 10 on the US Digital Songs chart that same week, becoming Ciara's sixth top-ten hit on the chart and first since "Love Sex Magic" in March 2009.

Music video
The music video for "Level Up" was filmed in 2017 but initially went unreleased as Ciara's contract with Warner Bros Records was terminated. It eventually premiered, alongside the single, on July 18, 2018. The video, which features the New Zealand dancers of ReQuest Dance Crew, was directed and choreographed by New Zealander Parris Goebel, who also appears as a dancer. The music video was filmed in the Auckland War Memorial Museum in Auckland. Ciara premiered a "Behind the Scenes" video through Trace Me on August 6, 2018.

The dance-centric clip opens with the words: "Be your own boss, love yourself, get up and dance. Level up!". Then Ciara dances while wearing headphones and a black leotard with the words "Level Up", accompanied by the all-female Request Dance Crew, dressed in matching red activewear and Bose headphones.

Reception
The music video received a positive critical response. Spin magazine's Israel Daramola opined "Choreographed by dancer Parris Goebel, Ciara and ReQuest put on an electric, mesmerizing performance and make it look easy." Within 24 hours of release, it became the #1 trending video on YouTube.

Live performances
Ciara has performed the song on the American Music Awards of 2018 and on The Ellen DeGeneres Show. The song is also performed on Bruno Mars' 24K Magic World Tour, where Ciara serves as an opening act.

Track listing
Digital download
"Level Up" – 3:24

Digital download – remix
"Level Up" (remix featuring Missy Elliott and Fatman Scoop) – 3:49

Personnel
Chris Athens — Mastered
Ciara — vocal producer
Jaycen Joshua - mixed
Samuel Kalandjian — engineer
Rashawn McLean — assistant mixer
Jacob Richards — assistant mixer
J.R. Rotem — keyboards, producer, vocal producer 
Mike Seaberg — assistant mixer

Charts

Certifications

References

2018 singles
2018 songs
Ciara songs
Songs written by Ciara
Songs written by J. R. Rotem
Songs written by Theron Feemster
Song recordings produced by J. R. Rotem
Songs written by Theron Thomas
Beauty Marks Entertainment singles
Song recordings produced by Ciara